Lasseter Highway is a fully sealed 244 kilometre highway in the Northern Territory of Australia. It connects Yulara, Kata Tjuta and Uluru east to the Stuart Highway at Erldunda. The highway is named after Lewis Hubert (Harold Bell) Lasseter, who claimed to have discovered a fabulously rich gold reef (Lasseter's Reef) west of Kata Tjuta.

Junctions

See also

 Highways in Australia
 List of highways in the Northern Territory

References

Highways in the Northern Territory